The Sweden Rugby League is the governing body for the sport of rugby league football in Sweden. The Association was formed in 2009. The Swedish rugby league international side debuted in 2010 against their neighbours Norway.

Honours
2013 Nordic Cup Champions

See also

 Rugby league in Sweden
 Sweden national rugby league team
 Nordic Cup (rugby league)

References

External links

Rugby league governing bodies in Europe
Rugby league in Sweden
Rugby League
Sports organizations established in 2009